
Gmina Korczyna is a rural gmina (administrative district) in Krosno County, Subcarpathian Voivodeship, in south-eastern Poland.

The gmina contains part of the protected area called Czarnorzeki-Strzyżów Landscape Park.

Villages
Gmina Korczyna contains the villages and settlements of Czarnorzeki, Iskrzynia, Kombornia, Korczyna, Krasna, Węglówka and Wola Komborska.

Neighbouring gminas
Gmina Korczyna is bordered by the city of Krosno and by the gminas of Haczów, Jasienica Rosielna, Krościenko Wyżne, Niebylec, Strzyżów and Wojaszówka.

References
Polish official population figures 2006

Korczyna
Krosno County